Alexander Stewart may refer to:

Politicians 
 Alexander Stewart (British Army officer) (c. 1739–1794), British army general, Scottish politician, MP for Kirkcudbright Stewartry 1786–94
 Alexander Stewart (1746–1831), Irish MP
 Alexander Stewart (Nova Scotian politician) (1794–1865), lawyer, judge and politician in Nova Scotia
 Alexander Robert Stewart (1795–1850), Irish MP
 Alexander Stewart (American politician) (1829–1912), US politician
 Alexander David Stewart (1852–1899), Canadian politician
 Alexander Stewart (British Columbia politician), mayor of Victoria, British Columbia from 1914 to 1916
 Alexander Stewart (MSP) (born 1962), Conservative Member of the Scottish Parliament

Nobles 
 Alexander Stewart, 4th High Steward of Scotland (died 1283), Scottish magnate
 Alexander Stewart of Bonkyll (c. 1271–1319), Scottish nobleman
 Alexander Stewart, Earl of Buchan (1343–1405), also known as the "Wolf of Badenoch", Scottish prince and magnate
 Alexander Stewart, Earl of Mar (1375–1435), Scottish nobleman
 Alexander Stewart, Duke of Rothesay (1430–1430)
 Alexander Stewart, Duke of Albany (c. 1454–1485), Scottish prince and magnate
 Alexander Stewart, 2nd Earl of Buchan (died 1505)
 Alexander Stewart, Duke of Ross (1514–1515)
 Alexander Stewart, 1st Earl of Galloway (1580–1649)
 Alexander Stewart, 6th Earl of Galloway (c. 1694–1773)
 Alexander Stewart (1699–1781) (1697/99–1781), ancestor of the Marquess of Londonderry

Religion 
 Alexander Stewart (bishop of Ross) (died 1371), Scottish prelate, Bishop of Ross
 Alexander Stewart (archbishop of St Andrews) (c. 1493–1513), Scottish prelate
 Alexander Stewart (bishop of Moray) (1477–1537), Scottish prelate, Bishop of Moray
 Alexander Stewart (moderator) (died 1915), principal of St Andrews University, moderator of the General Assembly of the Church of Scotland in 1911
 Alexander Doig Stewart (1926–1999), bishop of the Episcopal Diocese of Western Massachusetts

Sports 
 Alexander Stewart (rugby union) (1852–1945), Scottish international rugby union player
 Alexander Stewart (cricketer) (1858–1904), English cricketer

Others 
 Alexander Stewart (diplomat) (died 1593), Scottish landowner involved in negotiations about Mary, Queen of Scots
 Alexander Boyd Stewart (1904–1981), Scottish agriculturalist
 Alexander Dron Stewart (1883–1969), 20th-century Scottish physician and public health expert
 Alexander P. Stewart (1821–1908), American Confederate general
 Alexander Turney Stewart (1803–1876), American businessman
 Alexander Stewart (1999-current), Canadian Icon

See also 
 Alexander Stewart Provincial Park, a provincial park in central Ontario, Canada
 Alex Stewart (disambiguation)
 Sandy Stewart (disambiguation)
 Alexander Stuart (disambiguation)
 Alex Stuart (disambiguation)
 Stewart Alexander (disambiguation)